Arthur Henrique Vieira Araújo (born 17 June 1999) is a Brazilian footballer who plays as a central defender for Brasil de Pelotas, on loan from Cruzeiro.

Club career
Born in Belo Horizonte, Arthur finished his graduation from Cruzeiro academy. On 8 August 2017, he was promoted to the senior squad and signed a contract which would keep him at the club till the end of December 2020.

On 31 August 2017, Arthur made his debut for the club in a Primeira Liga match against Grêmio. He signed a contract extension in October, committing him to the club till March 2021.

On 10 January 2019, Arthur was loaned out to Tombense. He was then loaned out to Portuguese club G.D. Estoril Praia in August 2019 until the next summer. However, he was recalled by Cruzeiro on 8 January 2020 to compose the squad in the 2020 season.

Career statistics

References

External links

1999 births
Living people
Association football defenders
Brazilian footballers
Brazilian expatriate footballers
Footballers from Belo Horizonte
Cruzeiro Esporte Clube players
C.D. Nacional players
Tombense Futebol Clube players
G.D. Estoril Praia players
Campeonato Brasileiro Série A players
Campeonato Brasileiro Série B players
Campeonato Brasileiro Série C players
Primeira Liga players
Expatriate footballers in Portugal
América Futebol Clube (MG) players